Michael Isaiah Richardson (born February 18, 1984) is a former American football cornerback. He was drafted by the New England Patriots in the sixth round of the 2007 NFL Draft. He has also played for the Kansas City Chiefs.  He played college football at Notre Dame.

Early years
Richardson attended Warner Robins High School in Warner Robins, Georgia and was a letterman in football and track. In football, he was a two-time All-League pick.

College career
After graduating from high school, Richardson attended the University of Notre Dame. After redshirting his freshman season in 2002, Richardson played in all 13 games in 2003, mainly on special teams, seeing time at cornerback in three games. He started five games in 2004 at cornerback, recording one interception and forcing three fumbles. In 2005, Richardson would start all 12 games at cornerback and finished fifth on the team with 66 tackles while also picking up three interceptions. As a fifth-year senior in 2006, Richardson would lead all Division I-A independent schools with four interceptions. Richardson would play his final two seasons at Notre Dame under former Patriots offensive coordinator Charlie Weis, who became the Fighting Irish's head coach in 2005.

Pre-Draft
Mike Richardson measured in at 5'10" 188 pounds at his Pro Day.

He ran a 4.48 40 yard dash (1.47 10 yard split) with a 4.05 20 yard shuttle and 6.27 3 cone time. He had a vertical jump of 36" and broad jumped 10'7".

Professional career

New England Patriots
Richardson was drafted by the Patriots in the sixth round of the 2007 NFL Draft. He was placed on injured reserve by the team on August 28, 2007.

Richardson was waived by the Patriots on August 30, 2008 during final cuts. He was re-signed to the team's practice squad on September 1, where he remained until he was then promoted to the Patriots' active roster on October 20. That day, Richardson made his regular season debut on Monday Night Football against the Denver Broncos and picked up a season-high six tackles. Richardson would go on to play 10 games as a reserve cornerback for the Patriots in 2008, recording 17 total tackles.

He was released by the Patriots on August 17, 2009.

Kansas City Chiefs

On September 30, 2009, Richardson signed with the Kansas City Chiefs.
The Chiefs released Richardson on September 3, 2010 after training camp but was resigned on December 1, 2010. After playing in zero games, he was again released on December 26, 2010.

Indianapolis Colts
On December 27, 2010, Richardson was claimed off waivers by the Indianapolis Colts. He made his first appearance on January 2, 2011 against the Tennessee Titans on special teams and as a reserve cornerback and recorded 1 tackle.

References

External links
 New England Patriots bio
 Notre Dame Fighting Irish bio
 

1984 births
Living people
American football cornerbacks
Indianapolis Colts players
Kansas City Chiefs players
New England Patriots players
Notre Dame Fighting Irish football players
People from Warner Robins, Georgia
Players of American football from Georgia (U.S. state)
African-American players of American football
Sportspeople from Sumter, South Carolina
21st-century African-American sportspeople
20th-century African-American people